The Federation of Bakers is the main industry trade organisation in the UK for large-scale (industrial) baking of bread.

History
The equivalent of around 11 million loaves of bread are sold in the UK each day. Large bread baking companies in the UK produce around 80% of bread sold (by value), and around 75% comes from three main companies; in-store bakeries produce around 17%; and craft bakers produce the rest. 

The FOB was established in 1942 to help with the rationing of bread, called the National Loaf.

Function
The industry is worth £3.5bn, with around 20,000 employees. There are around 33 main bread bakeries, with nine main companies. The organisation works with the Flour Advisory Bureau.

Structure
It is headquartered in the London Borough of Camden, between the A400 (to the west) and Southampton Row (A4200, to the east).

See also
 Food Standards Agency, also in Camden borough
 History of bread
 List of British breads

References

External links
 FOB
 Educational factsheets
 Grain Chain

1942 establishments in the United Kingdom
Bakeries of the United Kingdom
Food industry trade groups based in the United Kingdom
Organisations based in the London Borough of Camden
Organizations established in 1942